Alsab (1939–1963) was an American Hall of Fame Thoroughbred racehorse.

Background

Alsab was bred in Kentucky by Thomas Piatt. His sire was Good Goods, and his dam was Winds Chant. Buyers were not interested in him, and Alsab was sold in 1940 for only $700 to Albert Sabath. He was named after his new owner.

Racing career
As a two-year-old, Alsab won the Washington Park Futurity, Champagne Stakes, and Mayflower Stakes.

In his three-year-old season, he was ridden by Basil James. He finished second to Shut Out in the Kentucky Derby and then won the Preakness Stakes. In the third leg of the Triple Crown he finished second to Shut Out in the Belmont Stakes.

On September 19, 1942, Alsab defeated the 1941 U.S. Triple Crown Champion Whirlaway in a match race at Narragansett Park in Pawtucket, Rhode Island.

Assessment and awards
Alsab was voted the 1941 U.S. Champion Two-Year-Old Colt. He also won 1942 U.S. Champion Three-Year-Old Colt honors.

In the Blood-Horse magazine List of the Top 100 U.S. Racehorses of the 20th Century, Alsab was voted #65. In 1976, he was inducted in the United States' National Museum of Racing and Hall of Fame.

Pedigree

References

 Alsab's pedigree and partial racing stats

1939 racehorse births
1963 racehorse deaths
Racehorses bred in Kentucky
Racehorses trained in the United States
Preakness Stakes winners
American Champion racehorses
United States Thoroughbred Racing Hall of Fame inductees
Thoroughbred family 27-a